The 1947 Marshall Thundering Herd football team was an American football team that represented Marshall University as an independent during the 1947 college football season. In its tenth season under head coach Cam Henderson, the team compiled a 9–3 record, lost to Catawba in the 1948 Tangerine Bowl and outscored opponents by a total of 342 to 125. Charlie Snyder and Chasey Wilson were the team captains. The team played its home games at Fairfield Stadium in Huntington, West Virginia.

Schedule

Team players drafted in the NFL
The following players were selected in the 1948 NFL Draft.

References

Marshall
Marshall Thundering Herd football seasons
Marshall Thundering Herd football